eXtremeDB is a high performance, low-latency, ACID-compliant embedded database management system using an in-memory database system (IMDS) architecture and designed to be linked into C/C++ based programs. It works on Windows, Linux, and other real-time and embedded operating systems.

History 
McObject LLC introduced eXtremeDB in 2001, targeting embedded systems running in resource-constrained environments (i.e. with limited random-access memory and relatively low-powered central processing units). eXtremeDB characteristics appealing to this market include a small code size (approximately 150 KB), native C language application programming interface, available source code, and a high degree of portability (to support the varied processors and operating systems used in embedded systems). Early deployments by customers included integration in digital TV set-top boxes, manufacturing and industrial control systems, and telecom/networking devices. eXtremeDB emerged to manage what industry analysts, and McObject, portray as significant growth in the amount of data managed on such devices.

Later editions targeted the high performance non-embedded software market, including capital markets applications (algorithmic trading, order matching engines) and real-time caching for Web-based applications, including social networks and e-commerce.

Product features

Core eXtremeDB engine 
eXtremeDB supports the following features across its product family.

Application programming interfaces 
 A type-safe, native, navigational C/C++ API
 SQL ODBC/JDBC API (included in eXtremeSQL edition)
 Native C# (.NET) API
 Java Native Interface (JNI)
 Python

Database indexes 
 B-tree
 R-tree
 Radix tree or Patricia trie
 k-d tree
 Hash table
 Trigram index
 Custom indexes

Concurrency mechanisms 
eXtremeDB supports multiple concurrent users, offering ACID-compliant transactions (as defined by Jim Gray) using either of two transaction managers: a multiple-reader, single writer (MURSIW) locking mechanism, or multiversion concurrency control (MVCC) transaction manager (optimistic non-locking model).

Supported data types 
eXtremeDB can work with virtually all C language data types including complex types including structures, arrays, vectors and BLOBs. Unicode is supported.

Security 
 Page-level cyclic redundancy checking (CRC)
 AES encryption
 Secure Sockets Layer

Optional features

Distributed database management abilities 
The eXtremeDB high availability edition supports both synchronous (2-safe) and asynchronous (1-safe) database replication, with automatic failover.  eXtremeDB Cluster edition provides for shared-nothing database clustering. eXtremeDB also supports distributed query processing, in which the database is partitioned horizontally and the DBMS distributes query processing across multiple servers, CPUs and/or CPU cores. eXtremeDB supports heterogeneous client platforms (e.g. a mix of Windows, Linux and RTOSs) with its clustering and high availability features. A single partitioned database can include shards running on a mix of hardware and OS platforms

Hybrid storage 
eXtremeDB Fusion edition provides the option of persistent storage (disk or flash) for specific tables, via a database schema notation.

Transaction logging 
eXtremeDB Transaction Logging edition keeps a record of changes made to the database and uses this log to provide recovery in the event of device or system failure. This edition includes eXtremeDB Data Relay technology that replicates selected changes to external systems such as enterprise applications and database systems.

SQL ODBC/JDBC 
The eXtremeSQL edition provides SQL ODBC support in eXtremeDB and a version 4, level 4 JDBC driver.

Kernel mode deployment 
The eXtremeDB Kernel Mode edition deploys the database system within an operating system kernel, to provide database functions to kernel-based applications logic.

Features for managing market data 

eXtremeDB Financial Edition provides features for managing market data (tick data) in applications such as algorithmic trading and order matching.  A “sequences” data type supports columnar data layout and enables eXtremeDB to offer the benefits of a column-oriented database in handling time series data. The Financial Edition also provides a library of vector-based statistical functions to analyze data in sequences, and a performance monitor.

Benchmarks 
McObject published reports on benchmark tests employing eXtremeDB. Main-Memory vs. RAM-Disk Databases: a Linux-Based Benchmark examined IMDS performance versus that of a traditional on-disk DBMS deployed on a RAM disk, on identical application tasks. The benchmark’s stated goal was to test the thesis that an IMDS streamlined architecture delivers a performance benefit beyond that provided by memory-based storage.  Another benchmark, the Terabyte-Plus In-Memory Database System (IMDS) Benchmark, documented IMDS scalability and performance in the size range of large enterprise application (versus embedded systems) databases. For the test, engineers created a 1.17 terabyte, 15.54 billion row database with eXtremeDB on a 160-core SGI Altix 4700 system running SUSE Linux Enterprise Server 9.

In November, 2012 a marketing report was published for Dell servers with Mellanox InfiniBand.

In late 2014, two additional audited benchmark reports focused on eXtremeDB Financial Edition. An October 29 report assessed McObject’s DBMS on IBM POWER8 hardware. A November 18 report documented the use of cloud computing.
In 2016. another report measured the eXtremeDB Financial Edition.

See also
 Embedded databases
 In-memory databases
 NoSQL - another marketing term

References

External links 
, McObject

Proprietary database management systems
Embedded databases